Westwinds is the seventh studio album by Canadian punk rock band The Real McKenzies. It was released on Fat Wreck Chords in 2012.

Track list

References

The Real McKenzies albums
2012 albums
Fat Wreck Chords albums